Davron is a given name

 Davron Askarov
 Davron Atabaev
 Davron Cameron
 Davron Ergashev
 Davron Fayziev
 Davron Khashimov
 Davron Mirzaev

See also 
 Davron, commune in north-central France
 Khurshid Davron

 Davronjon Tukhtasunov
 Nuriddin Davronov